Joseph Joos (1878–1965) was a prominent German intellectual and politician. As a Member of Parliament in Weimar, Joseph Joos grew to become one of the leading voices of the Christian Democratic Union in Germany. His convictions led him to become a political prisoner in the Dachau concentration camp from 1941 to 1945. After World War II, Joseph Joos became a close advisor to West Germany's Chancellor Konrad Adenauer.

Life

Joseph Joos was born on 13 November 1878 in Wintzenheim, near Colmar in Alsace, a region long disputed between France and Germany. At this time, Alsace belonged to Germany, which led Joos to follow the German education cursus. Following high school in Mulhouse and an apprenticeship in carpentry, Joos became the editor of the "Ober-Elsaessischen Landeszeitung", an Alsatian newspaper. As a committed Catholic, Joos got involved with the "Volksverein für das katholische Deutschland" (People Association for a Catholic Germany) in Mönchengladbach. He eventually became the editor of the Westdeutschen Arbeiterzeitung, which relayed the views of the Christian Democratic party. In 1905, he became the editor in chief. During World War I, Joos was a strong advocate of democracy in his editorials. As France took over Alsace following the 1919 Treaty of Versailles, Joos decided to remain involved in German politics and became an outspoken opponent of the then nascent National Socialist movement. When the Nazi Party came to power, Joos' political party came under a lot of pressure and his publications were often censored. In 1938, the Nazi authorities stripped Joos of his German citizenship as Alsatians were not considered reliable citizens in the imminence of a war. In 1940, Joos moved to Köln (Cologne) but was denounced and arrested for helping the French resistance in Alsace. In 1940, he was transferred to prisoner camp in Weissenburg in Bayern, in July 1941 to the Gestapo jail in Nuremberg and subsequently to the concentration camp of Dachau. In April 1945, he was transferred with about 140 other political prisoners to Niederdorf (South Tyrol). He was freed in May 1945.

As Alsace was now part of France and since Joos had lost his German citizenship, he was sent back to France. In 1949, Joos moved back to Germany but refused to take the German citizenship. Until 1960, he lived in Fulda. Joos became involved again with the German Christian Democrats. Thanks to his personal background and his credibility with the new German government as well as with the French Resistance, Joos became a prominent advocate for a European Union. He rejoined the Christian Democratic Union and became a special advisor on European Affairs to the German Chancellor Konrad Adenauer. In 1960, he moved to St Gallen in Switzerland for health reasons. He died in St Gallen on 11 March 1965.

Thanks to his lifelong piety and activism, on 8 December 1954, Joseph Joos was ordered Knight of the Order of the Holy Sepulchre of Jerusalem by Cardinal Nicola Canali, President of the Pontifical Commission for Vatican City State and Grand Master of the Order of the Holy Sepulchre of Jerusalem.

Public Office

Joseph Joos attended the Weimar National Assembly in January 1919 in his capacity of representative of the Christian Democrats of the Rhein region. He then became a full-time Christian Democrat deputy at the Weimar Reichsteig until November 1933.

 1920-1933: Member of the Zentrum (Center Party) coalition in Parliament
 1922: President of the Deutschen Katolischen Katholikentags in Munich and Chairperson of the Windthorstbundes, a youth organization of the Center Party
 1926-1932: Member of the Reichsbanner Schwarz-Rot-Gold organization
 1927: Chairman of the German Catholic Worker Movement
 1928: Chairman of the international Catholic Worker Movement
 1928: Member of the Volksverein für das katholische Deutschland (People Association for a Catholic Germany)
 1928-1933: Chairman of the Zentrum
 1933: Resignation from the management board of the Central Committee of German Catholics (ZdK)

Books on Joseph Joos
 Joachim Giers: "Joos, Josef". In: Neue Deutsche Biographie (NDB). Band 10, Duncker & Humblot, Berlin 1974, S. 595 f. (Digitalisat).
 Bernd Haunfelder: Reichstagsabgeordnete der Deutschen Zentrumspartei 1871–1933. Biographisches Handbuch und historische Photographien. Photodokumente zur Geschichte des Parlamentarismus und der politischen Parteien, Band 4. Düsseldorf 1999, S. 1325 f.
 Oswald Wachtling: Joseph Joos. Journalist, Arbeiterführer, Zentrumspolitiker. Politische Biographie 1878–1933. (Veröffentlichungen der Kommission für Zeitgeschichte, Reihe B: Forschungen, Band 16) Mainz 1974

External links
 Publications from and on Joseph Joos in the German National Library
 Joseph Joos in the archives of the German Parliament

1878 births
1965 deaths
People from Haut-Rhin
People from Alsace-Lorraine
German Roman Catholics
Centre Party (Germany) politicians
Members of the Weimar National Assembly
Members of the Reichstag of the Weimar Republic
Reichsbanner Schwarz-Rot-Gold members
Catholic Workers
Dachau concentration camp survivors
Knights of the Holy Sepulchre
Commanders Crosses of the Order of Merit of the Federal Republic of Germany
People from St. Gallen (city)